The Mersey Docks and Harbour Company (MDHC), formerly the Mersey Docks and Harbour Board (MDHB), owns and administers the dock facilities of the Port of Liverpool, on the River Mersey, England. These include the operation of the enclosed northern dock system that runs from Prince's Dock to Seaforth Dock, in the city of Liverpool and the dock facilities built around the Great Float of the Wirral Peninsula, located on the west side of the river.

Peel Ports, the MDHC's parent company, owns other maritime facilities in the area, including the Cammell Laird shipyard, Tranmere Oil Terminal and the Manchester Ship Canal.

History
Liverpool Common Council's Dock Committee was the original port authority.
In 1709, it had been authorised to construct Liverpool's first enclosed ship basin, the Old Dock, which was the world's first commercial wet dock. 
By 1750, the old Dock Committee was replaced by the Liverpool Dock Trustees.

In order to provide stone for the construction of the expanded dock system, from 1830 the trustees (and later the MDHB) operated large quarries at Creetown, Scotland.

The MDHB took over running of Liverpool's docks from the trustees in 1858. The need for Liverpool Corporation to divest its dock interests to a new public body was as a result of pressure from Parliament, dock merchants and some rival port operators.

At one point the MDHB railway totalled 104 miles (166 km) of line, with connections to many other railways. A section of the line ran, unsegregated from other road traffic, along the dock road. Today only the Canada Dock Branch is used.

In 1972, the MDHB was reconstituted as a company to allow it to raise money for new building initiatives and projects, including the new container dock at Seaforth. Four lightvessels in the approaches to the River Mersey were maintained by the MDHB until 1973.

The company operated a private lifeboat station that was involved in a number of incidents over the years.

Management
The MDHC was accused of "macho management"  by the Financial Times regarding its treatment of some of its staff in the 1990s, which resulted in the Liverpool dockers' strike.

On 22 September 2005, the MDHC was acquired by Peel Ports, part of the property and transport group Peel Group, which owns a minority stake in Liverpool John Lennon Airport.

Facilities 
Cammell Laird Dock is a dock at Birkenhead, on the Wirral Peninsula. It exits directly onto the River Mersey.

The dock was built as part of an expansion of the Cammell Laird shipyard at the turn of the 20th century by enclosing what was once Tranmere Pool.

Following the closure of the original Cammell Laird shipyard in 1993, the dock and the four remaining dry docks at the site are owned by the MDHC. All were subsequently leased, firstly to the A&P Group and then to Northwestern Shiprepairers & Shipbuilders, which officially renamed itself Cammell Laird Shiprepairers and Shipbuilders Ltd on 17 November 2008.

See also

Port of Liverpool
Associated British Ports
Peninsular and Oriental group
PD Ports

References

External links

 Peel Ports: Port of Liverpool

Mersey docks
Transport in Liverpool
Companies based in Liverpool
Transport operators of England
Companies formerly listed on the London Stock Exchange
Port operating companies
Peel Ports
1709 establishments in England
Organizations established in 1709
British companies established in 1709
Transport companies established in 1709